Liatris cylindracea (known as barrelhead blazing star, cylindric or cylindrical blazing star, Ontario blazing star, or dwarf blazing star) is a plant species in the family Asteraceae. It is native to eastern North America, where its populations are concentrated in the Midwestern United States. It is found in habitats such as prairies, limestone and sandstone outcroppings, bluffs, barrens, glades, woodlands and dunes.

Description
At the top of the stem is a single flower head or a loose to dense cluster (raceme, spike, or panicle) of 2 to 28 flower heads. The flowers bloom in mid to late summer, starting at the top of the cluster.

The basal and cauline leaves usually have three nerves, though sometimes up to five. The leaves are mostly hairless or may have some hairs on the margins. Some plants in Kentucky and Missouri are hairy; this may indicate hybridization with Liatris hirsuta. The largest leaves are a little above the bottom of the stem; above that, the leaves become gradually smaller.

References

External links
 
 

cylindracea
Flora of North America
Flora of Ontario
Flora of Alabama
Flora without expected TNC conservation status